Alfred Hughes (25 June 1930 – 18 June 2019) was an Australian rules footballer who played for Hawthorn in the VFL during the 1950s.

Hughes was recruited from East Brunswick and played mainly in the back pockets for Hawthorn.  In 1957 he won Hawthorn's best and fairest award and finished equal 7th in the Brownlow Medal count.

Honours and achievements
Individual
 Hawthorn best and fairest: 1957
 Hawthorn life member

References

External links

1930 births
Australian rules footballers from Victoria (Australia)
Hawthorn Football Club players
Peter Crimmins Medal winners
2019 deaths